Stettin is the German name of the city of Szczecin, Poland.

Stettin may also refer to:

Places
 Stettin, Wisconsin, U.S., a town
 Stettin (ghost town), Wisconsin, within the current town
 Stettin (region), a unit of territorial division in the Prussian Province of Pomerania 1816–1945
 Lagoon of Stettin or Stettin Bay, Szczecin Lagoon, a lagoon in the Oder estuary, shared by Germany and Poland
 Štítina (German: Stettin), a village  in Moravian Silesia, the Czech Republic
 Stettin, a locality in Lac Ste. Anne County, Alberta, Canada

Ships
 SMS Stettin, a light cruiser of the Imperial German Navy
 SS Stettin (1923), a German cargo ship
 SS Stettin (1925), a German cargo ship
 SS Stettin (1933), a German icebreaker

People and characters
 Dinah Stettin or Dinah Shtettin, Yiddish theatre actress
 Stettin Palver, a fictional character in Isaac Asimov's Foundation Series

See also
 Treaty of Stettin (1570), ending the Northern Seven Years' War
 Treaty of Stettin (1630), settling the conditions of Swedish occupation of the Duchy of Pomerania during the Thirty Years' War
 Treaty of Stettin (1653), settling territorial disputes of Brandenburg and Sweden in Pomerania after the Thirty Years' War
 Neu-Stettin or Szczecinek, a city in Poland
 Szczecin (disambiguation)